Sebastes inermis, the Japanese red seaperch or dark-banded rockfish, is a species of marine ray-finned fish belonging to the subfamily Sebastinae, the rockfishes, part of the family Scorpaenidae. It is found in the northwestern Pacific Ocean.

Taxonomy
Sebastes inermis was first formally described in 1829 by the French zoologist Georges Cuvier with the type locality given as Japan. Together with S. ventricosus and S. cheni these three taxa form a species complex and have been treated as a single species in the past. Some authorities place this species complex in the subgenus Mebarus. The specific name inermis means “unarmed”, a reference to the relatively small spines on the head.

Description
Sebastes inermis has sharp lachrymal spines with the rest of the spines on the head are rather weak. The caudal fin is not strongly emarginate. It has a dark red or pale brown body on the back and flanks. The pectoral fins reach beyond the level of the anus when held down., The pectoral fins have 15 rays while the anal fin has 7 rays.

Distribution and habitat
Sebastes inermis it occurs from southern Hokkaido southward to Kyushu, Japan, and the southern part of the Korean Peninsula. It is a demersal fish with pelagic juveniles which live among floating mats of seaweeds.

Biology
Sebastes inermis feeds on zooplankton. The male initiates courtship when a female approaches their territory and perform a lateral display with rushing and turning movements being recorded frequently as part of the courtship. The courtship behaviour lasts for around 30 minutes before copulation.

Human usage
Sebastes inermis is one of the most important target species for fisheries in Japan and is also grown in aquaculture to supply market demand.

References

inermis
Sport fish
Fish of Korea
Taxa named by Georges Cuvier 
Fish described in 1829